Edmonton/Morinville (Mike's Field) Aerodrome  is located  northeast of Morinville in the Edmonton Metropolitan Region, Alberta, Canada.

See also
List of airports in the Edmonton Metropolitan Region

References

Registered aerodromes in Alberta
Aviation in Edmonton
Sturgeon County